Enrique Eloy Estévez Boero (born 12 July 1983) is an Argentine politician, currently serving as National Deputy representing Santa Fe Province. A member of the Socialist Party, Estévez sits in the Federal parliamentary inter-bloc.

Estévez made a career within the Socialist Party in Santa Fe before being elected to the City Council of Rosario in 2015. He was Secretary General of the Socialist Party Youth and currently serves as Secretary General of the Santa Fe chapter of the Socialist Party.

Early and personal life
Enrique Eloy Estévez Boero was born on 12 July 1983 in Rosario. His father was Guillermo Estévez Boero, a prominent Socialist politician and co-founder of the Popular Socialist Party.

Political career
Estévez's political career began in the Socialist Party Youth. By 2013, he was secretary general of the Juventud Socialista, the party's youth wing. Estévez ran for a seat in the Rosario City Council in the 2015 municipal election, as part of the Progressive, Civic and Social Front list. The list was the most voted in the city, and Estévez was elected.

In 2016, Estévez was elected Secretary General of the Santa Fe Socialist Party. He was re-elected for a second mandate in 2021, with 68.8% of the vote.

At the 2019 legislative election, Estévez was the first candidate in the Federal Consensus list to the Chamber of Deputies. The list was the third-most voted, with 10.00% of the vote, and only Estévez was elected.

As a national deputy, Estévez formed part of the parliamentary commissions on Cooperative Affairs and NGOs, Education, Labour Legislation, Women and Diversity, and Petitions, Powers and Norms. Estévez was a supporter of the legalization of abortion in Argentina. He voted in favor of the 2020 Voluntary Interruption of Pregnancy bill, in line with the historic position of the Socialist Party.

References

External links
Profile on the official website of the Chamber of Deputies (in Spanish)

Living people
1983 births
People from Rosario, Santa Fe
Members of the Argentine Chamber of Deputies elected in Santa Fe
Socialist Party (Argentina) politicians
21st-century Argentine politicians